Park Jong-Jin (born 4 May 1980) is a South Korean retired football defender who played for Daegu FC.

Club career

Park was born in Gokseong, Jeonnam.  His professional career began with Daegu FC. He is one of Daegu FC's foundation players, and featured in every season for the club from 2003 to 2007. In 2008, he shifted to Gwangju Sangmu, the sports division of the military, due to his joining the army for his compulsory two-year military service.  He played in the majority of the league matches for Sangmu during the 2008 season, but did not play a single game for the club during 2009 season.

On 22 October 2009, he was discharged from the army, having fulfilled his military commitments, and returned to Daegu FC.  He quickly resumed playing duties, participating in the final match of the 2009 season. On 25 July 2010, Park celebrated 200 professional appearances with his match against Gyeongnam FC.

Club career statistics

References

External links 

1980 births
Living people
Association football defenders
South Korean footballers
Daegu FC players
Gimcheon Sangmu FC players
K League 1 players
K League 2 players
Sportspeople from South Jeolla Province